John Kane may refer to:

Entertainment
 John Kane (actor) (1746–1799), Irish actor and comedian
 John Kane (artist) (1860–1934), Scottish-born American painter
 John Kane (writer) (born 1945), British actor and writer

Law
 John L. Kane Jr. (born 1937), U.S. federal judge
 M. John Kane IV, Oklahoma Supreme Court Justice

Military
 John Kane (Medal of Honor), American soldier who fought in the American Civil War
 John R. Kane (1907–1996), American aviator and Medal of Honor recipient

Politics
 John I. Kane, American politician, Pennsylvania State Senator, and trade unionist
 John K. Kane (1795–1858), American politician
 John Kane (trade unionist) (1819–1876), British trade unionist
 Jock Kane (John Kane, 1921–2013), British intelligence agency officer and GCHQ whistleblower
 John Kane (politician), American politician, Oklahoma State House Representative

Sports
 John Kane (outfielder) (1882–1934), American baseball outfielder for the Cubs and Reds
 John Kane (infielder) (1900–1956), American baseball infielder for the Chicago White Sox
 John Kane (footballer, born 1960), English football player
 John Kane (footballer, born 1987), Scottish football player

Other
 John M. Kane, American psychiatrist
 John Innes Kane, American explorer, scientist and philanthropist

See also
 Jonny Kane (born 1973), British racing driver
 Jack Kane (1908–1988), Australian politician
 John Du Cane (born 1949), author
 John Cain (disambiguation)
 John Caine (disambiguation)